The Ninety-Forth Arkansas General Assembly is the legislative body of the state of Arkansas in 2023 and 2024. The Arkansas Senate and Arkansas House of Representatives were both controlled by the Republicans. In the Senate, 29 senators were Republicans and 6 were Democrats. In the House, 82 representatives were Republicans and 18 were Democrats.

Sessions
The Regular Session of the 94th General Assembly opened on January 9, 2023.

Senate

Leadership

Officers

Floor Leaders

Senators

House of Representatives

Leadership

Officers

Floor Leaders

Representatives

References

Arkansas legislative sessions
Arkansas
Arkansas